Lodderena pulchella is a species of minute sea snail, a marine gastropod mollusk in the family Skeneidae.

Description
The size of the shell attains 0.85 mm.

Distribution
This species occurs in the Gulf of Mexico, the Caribbean Sea and in the Atlantic Ocean off Brazil at depths up to 100 m.

References

 Olsson, A. A. and T. L. McGinty. 1958. Recent marine mollusks from the Caribbean coast of Panama with the description of some new genera and species. Bulletins of American Paleontology 39: 1–58, pls. 1–5. 
 Rosenberg, G., F. Moretzsohn, and E. F. García. 2009. Gastropoda (Mollusca) of the Gulf of Mexico, Pp. 579–699 in Felder, D.L. and D.K. Camp (eds.), Gulf of Mexico–Origins, Waters, and Biota. Biodiversity. Texas A&M Press, College Station, Texas

External links
 

 pulchella
Gastropods described in 1958